Francisco Javier García Cabeza de Vaca (born 17 September 1967) is a Mexican politician affiliated with the PAN, and the Governor of Tamaulipas from 2016 to 2022. García has previously served as a local and federal legislator, having served one term in the Chamber of Deputies and three and a half years in the Senate.

Governor García Cabeza de Vaca was accused by Emilio Lozoya Austin, former director of Pemex, in July 2020 of receiving bribes in 2013–2014 to support energy reform legislation.

An arrest warrant was issued for Cabeza de Vaca on 19 May 2021 by the Attorney General's Office of Mexico, which accused him of corruption. The governor, who retained immunity only within Tamaulipas after a constitutional dispute on the matter, rejected the accusations as politically motivated.

Life
García was born in McAllen, Texas and holds dual US and Mexican citizenship; he graduated from McAllen Memorial High School. His family owns Maquinados Industriales de Reynosa and Desarrolladora Cava, companies that have provided service to such clients as Pemex, Caminos y Puentes Federales (CAPUFE), and the National Water Commission (CONAGUA). At the age of 12, he competed as a track and field athlete, the 1979 Tamaulipas state champion. As a result, he was sent to the National Athletic Tournament in Monterrey representing his home state. He received undergraduate degrees in business administration and branding from Houston Baptist University; while at HBU, he played on the school's soccer team. García would also obtain a master's degree from the Universidad de Monterrey.

In the late 1990s, García joined the PAN and began his political career. He served as a regional coordinator for the 1998 Tamaulipas gubernatorial election, and in 2000, he coordinated the Organización Amigos de Fox A.C. Zona Norte de Tamaulipas and was a member of the Consejo Estatal Amigos de Fox, both organizations devoted to the presidential campaign of Vicente Fox. That same year, voters sent him to the LVIII Legislature, where he served as the secretary of the Commission on Population, Borders and Migratory Matters and sat on two work commissions. In 2004, García became a national councilor for the PAN, a position he would hold until 2013.

Around this time, García founded Productos Chamoyada, S.A. de C.V., a Reynosa-based company devoted to the creation of confectionery products. In November 2009, the United States Food and Drug Administration circulated Import Alert 33–12, ordering the seizure of all hard and soft candies containing sweet peppers that Chamoyada and other companies attempted to export into the United States. The alert was issued because a 1997 inspection of similar sweets by the FDA's Dallas Division found them to contain "rodent filth and insect filth".

After a failed bid in 2002, Reynosa voters elected García to the municipal presidency from 2005 to 2007; during this time, he served as the liaison between mayors and the 2006 PAN presidential candidate, Felipe Calderón Hinojosa. He then bounced around in different positions. From 2008 to 2010, he represented Reynosa in the LX Legislature of Tamaulipas, heading the PAN parliamentary group in the state congress. For a time in 2011, he was the Director General of the Commission for the Regularization of Land Holdings (CORETT).

In 2012, García returned to Congress, this time as a senator for the LXII and LXIII Legislatures. He presided over the Agrarian Reform Commission and served on the commissions for the Navy, Communications and Transportation, and Energy; at the start of the LXIII Legislature, he also picked up the presidency of the National Defense Commission. Among his legislative projects were laws that toughened sanctions against judges and politicians involved with organized crime and penalized the improper use of uniforms.

2016 gubernatorial campaign 
Effective January 29, 2016, García resigned from the Chamber of Deputies to pursue the governorship of Tamaulipas.

During the elections, a video attributed to Anonymous was released claiming that García owned a variety of undeclared properties, including a $2.5 million home in an exclusive Mexico City golf club allegedly acquired in 2015. The Party of the Democratic Revolution claimed that in three municipalities, organized crime had threatened all political parties and ordered them to support García's election.

In the June 5 elections, García earned 50.1 percent of the vote, making him the first non-PRI governor of the state in 86 years. He beat Baltazar Hinojosa Ochoa, the PRI candidate. In the state of Tamaulipas, it supports the economic development of the region with its work.

Governor 2016-2022
By 2021, he was known as an "outspoken critic" of President Andrés Manuel López Obrador.

Immunity conflict 
In 2021, the Attorney General of Mexico (FGR) asked the Congress of Tamaulipas to remove García's fuero (parliamentary immunity) from prosecution, claiming there was evidence of ties to drug cartels, money-laundering, and tax fraud. The request was confirmed by MORENA's deputy, Ignacio Mier, on 23 February 23, 2021, although representatives of the PAN party insisted the move was politically motivated in light of the 2021 Mexican elections. Early in 2021, when he was accused of money laundering, the Financial Intelligence Unit in Mexico claimed Garcia Cabeca de Vaca had numerous properties in Mexico and Texas, with the governor in March saying none of the homes in the report were his. On 22 March 2021 he appeared before the FGR to hear the accusations against him, gaining access to the investigation files against him that he'd previously been denied access to. Garcia Cabeza de Vaca affirmed he would prove his innocence.

By April 2021, while he had been accused of organized crime and money laundering by the Mexican District Attorney's Office, but there had been no evidence found to support the accusations. At the end of April 2021, the House of Representatives voted 302 in favor of, 134 against, and 14 abstaining for removing Garcia Cabeza's immunity against federal charges, which could lead to him being potentially charged with tax evasion.

Warrant conflict 
An arrest warrant was issued for Cabeza de Vaca on 19 May 2021 by the Attorney General's Office of Mexico, which accused him of corruption. His bank accounts were also reported frozen by federal prosecutors and the National Migration Institute (INM) announced it had issued an immigration alert to track Cabeza de Vaca's movements. In response to the media noting the warrant originated in the National Palace, president Lopez Obrador asserted he had not given instructions for the arrest as "The Public Prosecutor's Office is autonomous" and revenge was "not his strength."

On Twitter the governor rejected the accusations as politically motivated, while the National Action Party said the warrant represented a "break in the constitutional order for political reasons." At the time, "a disagreement between courts, prosecutors and state and federal legislatures [made] it unclear whether the Tamaulipas state governor can be arrested, or whether he still enjoys immunity from prosecution as an elected official." While the federal Congress, dominated by the party of the president, had previously voted to remove immunity, while state legislature refused to recognize the vote. The Supreme Court had desisted on sharing an opinion, which according to the Associated Press, appeared to leave the governor "in a situation of retaining his immunity" only within Tamaulipas.  On 20 May 2021, Congress of Tamaulipas agreed to sue the Attorney Generals of the Republic (FGR) and General of the State over the arrest warrant, arguing it violated their sovereignty. PAN politicians in the Congress stressed the Attorney General lacked the jurisdiction to detain Garcia Cabeza de Vaca, and that it was not considering an interim governor appointment.

On 20 May 2021, President Lopez Obrador said that if the United States sent any diplomatic documents concerning the "bizarre standoff" between the president and governor, he would possibly publish them himself, even if they contained sensitive information. He displayed a May 4 letter from the legal attaché of the US Embassy, asking for "information on Garcia Cabeza de Vaca as part of a U.S. money laundering investigation." On 21 May 2021, Milenio reported that the Financial Intelligence Unit had "handed over all information" about Cabeza de Vaca and the entirety of his family to the FBI, the DEA, and FinCEN in the United States.

On 27 May 2021, UIF filed a complaint against García Cabeza de Vaca for embezzlement. After he hired a law firm in Houston, Texas, the FIU asked the FGR to investigate whether he was using public funds to pay for legal advisory services.

Return to public events 
On 26 May 2021, a corrupt judge suspended the arrest warrant, preventing the FGR from arresting him.
 He was reported to hold a videoconference meeting at Casa Tam with governors and the secretary of the interior on 27 May 2021, reporting the meeting on his Twitter account. On 30 May 2021, a judge ruled that despite the pulled warrant, criminal proceedings could not be prevented. On 31 May 2021, he was present at an event to launch a "pilot plan" to re-open schools for young children in the state. On 6 June 2021, it was reported he had ended his contractual relationship with his lawyer and was changing his defense team. On 7 June 2021, the UIF was ordered to unfreeze the accounts of his relatives, including his mother, wife, and brother. The judge argued the freezes were unconstitutional, as the origin and legal support of the action by the FIU was unknown and undeclared. On 22 June, a federal judge is to decide whether the governor would continue to be granted protection from federal arrest.

See also
 List of presidents of Reynosa Municipality

References

External links
"Revelan narcopago a Senador del PAN" (Archive). El Norte. 17 December 2015. 

1967 births
Living people
Members of the Senate of the Republic (Mexico) for Tamaulipas
Members of the Chamber of Deputies (Mexico) for Tamaulipas
Members of the Congress of Tamaulipas
Municipal presidents in Tamaulipas
National Action Party (Mexico) politicians
People from Reynosa
Houston Christian Huskies men's soccer players
21st-century Mexican politicians
21st-century American politicians
American people of Mexican descent
Association footballers not categorized by position
Governors of Tamaulipas
People from Brownsville, Texas
Association football players not categorized by nationality
Politicians from Tamaulipas
Deputies of the LVIII Legislature of Mexico
Senators of the LXII and LXIII Legislatures of Mexico